Josef Rieder (26 December 1893 – 13 July 1916) was a German cyclist. He competed in two events at the 1912 Summer Olympics. He died during the Battle of Verdun in the First World War.

See also
 List of Olympians killed in World War I

References

External links
 

1893 births
1916 deaths
German male cyclists
Olympic cyclists of Germany
Cyclists at the 1912 Summer Olympics
Cyclists from Munich
German military personnel killed in World War I
People from the Kingdom of Bavaria